Brenda Davidson (born 20 September 1964) is a Canadian female curler. She competed at the 2015 Winter Deaflympics at the age of 50.

Davidson started her curling career (deaf curling) at the age of just 18. She has also participated in the Women's Deaf Canadian Championships twice in 1999 and in 2003.

In the 2015 Winter Deaflympics held in Russia, she won the bronze medal in the curling team event.

Brenda Davidson is currently coaching Special Olympics curling in the city of Thompson.

References 

1964 births
Living people
Deaf sportspeople
Canadian women curlers
Curlers from Manitoba
Canadian deaf people
People from Thompson, Manitoba